The surname Seguí is a surname. Notable people with the surname include:
Antonio Seguí (born 1934), Argentine painter and printmaker
David Seguí  (born 1966), Cuban-American former Major League Baseball infielder
Diego Seguí  (born 1937), Cuban former Major League Baseball pitcher
Enrique Eguía Seguí (born 1962), prelate of the Roman Catholic Church
Juan Seguí (born 1947), Spanish former sport shooter who competed in the 1976 Summer Olympics
Luis Miguel Seguí (born 1972), Spanish actor and producer
Salvador Seguí (1886–1923), Catalan anarcho-syndicalist

See also
Seguí, a village in Argentina
Séguy